CAMS Jayco Australian Formula 4 Championship was an Australian motor racing series for open-wheel cars complying with FIA Formula 4 regulations. The inaugural championship was contested in 2015.

Formula 4 had been developed and certified by the FIA as the pre-eminent open-wheel development category across the globe; the critical step between elite junior karting, Formula 3 and ultimately Formula 1. Cameron McConville was the original Category Director, with Karl Reindler as Driver Coach and Driving Standards Observer for the championship.

The series struggled for grid numbers from the outset. The first round had 13 cars and that grid size would not be exceeded until 2019 and then only once. The 2018 season never had more than eleven cars and all bar one round of the 2019 season had only eight cars. On the 4th of September 2019, it was announced that the series would not be contested in 2020 but there was a possibility it could continue in the future.

History
In November 2013, the Confederation of Australian Motor Sport (CAMS) announced that it would introduce the FIA Formula 4 category to Australia. This was followed on 12 March 2014 by the official launch of the Australian F4 Championship. Australian F4 cars were to use the French Mygale chassis and Ford EcoBoost engine, and the series would comprise seven rounds in conjunction with V8 Supercars events.

Australian recreational vehicle manufacturer Jayco was confirmed as the championship's title sponsor in December 2014 as part of a three-year agreement from 2015 onward.

The first round was held at Townsville on 11 July 2015. AGI Sport's Will Brown was the category's first race winner, with Team BRM's Jordan Lloyd claiming the overall round victory.

Lloyd would then go on to secure the inaugural championship and a $150,000 prize courtesy of Jayco's Road To The World initiative, which assisted Lloyd in securing a USF2000 seat in 2016. Lloyd also received a European Formula 3 test courtesy of Carlin Motorsport.

Car
The championship features Mygale designed and built cars constructed of carbon fibre and featuring a monocoque chassis. Power is provided by a 1.6-litre turbocharged Ford EcoBoost engine.

Champions

Drivers

Rookie

Circuits

Notes

References

External links
 
 

 
Formula racing series
Recurring sporting events established in 2015
Recurring sporting events disestablished in 2019
Formula 4
Formula 4 series
2015 establishments in Australia
2019 disestablishments in Australia